Monasterolo Casotto is a comune (municipality) in the Province of Cuneo in the Italian region Piedmont, located about  south of Turin and about  east of Cuneo.

Monasterolo Casotto borders the following municipalities: Lisio, Mombasiglio, Pamparato, San Michele Mondovì, Scagnello, Torre Mondovì, and Viola.

References 

Cities and towns in Piedmont